Fighter kites in Afghanistan, Bangladesh, India, Nepal and Pakistan fly on abrasive string called manja (or manjha). In Brazil, similar string is called "cerol", and in Chile "hilo curado".

Kites are typically flown in specific seasons or festivals. All flyers will use coloured manja line, coated with powdered glass, and attempt to cut down opposing kites - which  will drift away. Participants or bystanders often run after and try to capture such kites; a practice known as kite running.

Names

Abrasive cutting line for fighter kites is known under many local names:

 manjha – India, Nepal, Bangladesh and Pakistan.
 tar – Afghanistan
 hilo de competencia – Chile
 hilo curado – Chile
 dore – India and Pakistan
 manjho – Rajasthan, India
 gelasan – Indonesia
 cerol – Brazil

Composition 

Traditional manja is based on fine pure cotton thread coated with a mixture of rice glue, tree gums and similar natural ingredients - and an abrasive: finely powdered glass, aluminum oxide or zirconia alumina. In some places individuals make their own manja from personal 'secret' recipes - but most is made by specialist craftsman on a large scale.

So-called "chemical manja" or "Chinese manja" is a relatively recent introduction. It is based on non biodegradable synthetic fibers. This makes it harder to break, which can be seen as unsportsmanlike, and makes the string more dangerous to bystanders and birds.

In Brazil, in addition to cerol, there is a more dangerous version of the kite string, the so-called "linha chilena" (Chilean string), which contains essentially the same ingredients used to make cerol, but with the addition of quartz powder and aluminum powder, which makes the string four times more dangerous than regular cerol.

Safety

Fighters often fly the kites from rooftops, which poses risks to their safety.

Kite runners
Kite runners, gazing at the kite while following it, often lose focus of their surroundings and they may run onto roads or train tracks without paying attention to oncoming traffic or trains. They may also run risks by scaling trees and buildings in order to retrieve kites that land there, where they may fall as a result.

Bystanders being cut
Others are also at risk, with many reports of motorcyclists and others having their throats cut by manja - especially when driving through hanging strings. These sorts of incidents have led to calls for bans of the sale of glass-coated kite string in many regions. The Chamber of Deputies of Chile enacted a law in 2013 forbidding the use of "hilo curado" by law, with the only exceptions being for professional kite flyers in secured locations for competitive use, using strings coated with silicon powder. In 2010, one report said that the ban on Chinese manja in India did not work to curb its sale.

Threat to birds 
Manja is also dangerous to birds as kites that land in trees do not allow for the strings to break apart easily, frequently causing injuries that require their rescue. A pair of volunteer bird medics in New Delhi care for about 1,000 black kites each year, 90% of which are injured by manja and half of which die.

At the Uttarayan festival, veterinarians had to repeatedly respond to situations where birds had been injured.

References

Kites